The 2012 Queensland Cup season was the 17th season of Queensland's top-level statewide rugby league competition run by the Queensland Rugby League. The competition, known as the Intrust Super Cup due to sponsorship from Intrust Super, featured 12 teams playing a 26-week long season (including finals) from March to September.

The Wynnum Manly Seagulls became the second team to win back-to-back premierships after defeating the Redcliffe Dolphins 20–10 in the Grand Final at Suncorp Stadium. Redcliffe Dolphins'  Luke Capewell was named the competition's Player of the Year, winning the Courier Mail Medal.

Teams
In 2012, the lineup of teams remained unchanged for the fourth consecutive year. The Central Comets began playing as the Central Queensland Capras again after using the Comets moniker for 12 seasons. The Canberra Raiders ended their four-year affiliation with the Souths Logan Magpies, opting to return to the New South Wales Cup competition.

Ladder

Finals series
In 2012, the Queensland Cup competition returned to a five-team finals series for the first time since 2008.

Grand Final

Redcliffe finished the regular season in first and won the minor premiership for the first time since 2002. They qualified for their 10th Grand Final after defeating Tweed Heads in the major semi final. It would be their first Grand Final appearance since 2007. Reigning premiers Wynnum Manly finished in second and faced Tweed Heads in the qualifying final, losing 16–19. This sent them to the Week 2 elimination final, where they defeated Norths 30–22. In the preliminary final, they got their revenge on Tweed, winning 30–4 to qualify for their second consecutive Grand Final.

First half
Redcliffe opened the scoring the Grand Final with a try to winger Liam Georgetown after a 40-metre line break from Marty Hatfield. In a low scoring half, Wynnum Manly levelled the scores five minutes before the break when a Luke Dalziel-Don offload found five-eighth Jacob Fauid who scored near the uprights.

Second half
The Seagulls came out firing in the second half, opening the scoring in the 42nd minute when centre Jason Moon crossed out wide. They extended their lead to eight after capitalising on a Dolphins' error, with winger Peter Gubb scoring in the 53rd minute. With six minutes remaining, the Dolphins set up a thrilling finish when winger Delroy Berryman scored after a Luke Capewell chip kick found fullback Joe Bond, who in turn found Berryman. Wynnum Manly sealed the victory, and their second premiership, in the 78th minute when interchange prop Charlie Gubb barged over under the posts. Retiring forward Dane Carlaw converted the try from in front to end his career on a high. Wynnum Manly became just the second club, after Redcliffe in 2002–2003, to win back-to-back premierships.

The 2012 Grand Final would be the last game at the club for Seagulls' head coach Paul Green, who joined the Sydney Roosters as an assistant to the NRL side and head coach of the under-20 side in 2013. In 2014, Green became head coach of the North Queensland Cowboys and reunited with Jake Granville a year later, as the pair won the 2015 NRL Grand Final.

End-of-season awards
 Courier Mail Medal (Best and Fairest): Luke Capewell ( Redcliffe Dolphins)
 Coach of the Year: Ben & Shane Walker ( Ipswich Jets)
 Rookie of the Year: Ethan Lowe ( Northern Pride)
 Representative Player of the Year: Grant Rovelli ( Queensland Residents,  Mackay Cutters)

See also

 Queensland Cup
 Queensland Rugby League

References

2012 in Australian rugby league
Queensland Cup